The Bell YOH-4 (originally YHO-4) was a single-engine, single-rotor light helicopter, developed for the United States Army's Light Observation Helicopter program. While the YOH-4A was unsuccessful in the original LOH competition, Bell redesigned it as the sleek Bell 206A JetRanger for the commercial market, and enjoyed instant and lasting success. In 1967, the Army reopened the LOH competition, and the 206A-based OH-58 Kiowa was selected.

Development
On 14 October 1960, the United States Navy solicited responses from 25 aircraft manufacturers to a request for proposals (RFP) on behalf of the Army for the Light Observation Helicopter (LOH). Bell entered the competition along with 12 other manufacturers, including Hiller Aircraft and Hughes Tool Co., Aircraft Division. In January 1961, Bell submitted Design 250 (D-250), which would eventually be designated as the YHO-4. On 19 May 1961, Bell and Hiller were announced as winners of the design competition.

Bell produced five prototypes of the D-250, as Model 206, in 1962, the first prototype making its maiden flight on 8 December 1962. That same year, all aircraft began to be designated according to the new Joint Services designation system, so the prototype aircraft were redesignated YOH-4A. The YOH-4A also became known as the Ugly Duckling in comparison to the other contending aircraft.  Following a flyoff of the Bell, Hughes and Fairchild-Hiller prototypes, the Hughes OH-6 was selected in May 1965.

After the failed military contract bid, Bell attempted to market the Model 206, but it did not fare well commercially.  Bell's market research showed that customers found the body design mostly unpalatable. Bell would eventually redesign the body of the airframe to a more sleek and aesthetic design and reintroduced it as the Bell 206A JetRanger.

Variants

YHO-4
Bell 206 powered by a 250shp T63-A-5 for Army evaluation, five built later redesignated YOH-4A
YOH-4A
YHO-4s redesignated.

Operators

 United States Army

Surviving aircraft
The remaining OH-4A 62-4202 is in storage at the United States Army Aviation Museum, Fort Rucker, Alabama.

Specifications (OH-4A)

See also

References

Notes

Citations

Bibliography
 Spenser, Jay P. "Bell Helicopter". Whirlybirds, A History of the U.S. Helicopter Pioneers. University of Washington Press, 1998. .

External links

 HO-4/OH-4 page on GlobalSecurity.org

United States military helicopters
1960s United States military reconnaissance aircraft
1960s United States helicopters
H-004, O
Single-turbine helicopters
Aircraft first flown in 1962